María Teresa "Maite" Zúñiga Domínguez (born 28 December 1964 in Eibar) is a retired Spanish middle-distance runner.

International competitions

External links

1964 births
Living people
Spanish female middle-distance runners
Athletes (track and field) at the 1988 Summer Olympics
Athletes (track and field) at the 1992 Summer Olympics
Athletes (track and field) at the 1996 Summer Olympics
Olympic athletes of Spain
World Athletics Championships athletes for Spain
Sportspeople from Eibar
Mediterranean Games bronze medalists for Spain
Mediterranean Games medalists in athletics
Athletes (track and field) at the 1983 Mediterranean Games
Athletes (track and field) at the 1997 Mediterranean Games
Athletes from the Basque Country (autonomous community)